Lesia Maruschak (born 1961) is a Canadian photographer, living in Ottawa. Her work Maria about the Ukrainian famine, has been published as a book, exhibited at the National Museum of the Holodomor-Genocide in Kyiv, Ukraine and won the Grand Prix at Arsenal Book Festival there.

She was awarded the Governor General of Canada's Sovereign's Medal for Volunteers for her blood cancer charity work.

Life and work
Maruschak was born in Saskatoon, Canada and is of Ukrainian descent. She received an MA in Ethnography from the University of Saskatchewan, Saskatoon and an MBA in Competitive Intelligence from the University of Ottawa, Ottawa. She lives in Ottawa.

Charity work
Maruschak has a blood cancer known as chronic lymphocytic leukemia. She was awarded the Governor General of Canada's Sovereign's Medal for Volunteers in 2013 for volunteering, fundraising and awareness raising around the topic, and for founding the non-profit organisation Cure: Blood Cancer.

Photography
Her Project Maria or Maria is based on a photograph of Maria F, a girl who survived Holodomor, the Soviet Ukrainian famine of 1932–33. Maruschak's fictional album of Maria's life "chisels out Maria's fate and portrays the relationship between the past and our time".

Publications
Maria. Charkiw-Kyiv, Ukraine: Red Zet, 2018. . Edition of 200 copies.
Transfiguration. Ottawa: Folio Efemera; Portland: Wiesedruck, 2018. . With an essay by Alison Nordström, "From Ashes".

Awards
Sovereign's Medal for Volunteers, Governor General of Canada
Experiment category, Arsenal Book Festival, Kyiv, Ukraine, 2019 for Maria
Grand Prix of the Contest, Arsenal Book Festival, Kyiv, Ukraine, 2019 for Maria

Solo exhibitions
Walking, Maine Media Art Gallery, Maine Media Workshops, Rockport, Maine, USA, 2018
Project Maria, Landskrona Citadel, Landskrona Foto festival, Landskrona, Scania, Sweden, 2020; National Museum of the Holodomor-Genocide, Kyiv, Ukraine, 2020/21

References

External links

21st-century Canadian photographers
Canadian women photographers
Artists from Saskatchewan
University of Saskatchewan alumni
University of Ottawa alumni
Living people
1961 births